The Prasco Charity Championship was a tournament on the Symetra Tour, the LPGA's developmental tour. It was a part of the Symetra Tour's schedule from 2018 to 2021. It was held at TPC River's Bend in Cincinnati, Ohio.

The title sponsor, Prasco Laboratories, is a privately-held pharmaceutical company headquartered in Cincinnati.

In 2020, the tournament was postponed and then cancelled due to the COVID-19 pandemic.

Winners

References

External links

Coverage on Symetra Tour website

Former Symetra Tour events
Golf in Ohio
Recurring sporting events established in 2018
Recurring sporting events disestablished in 2021
2018 establishments in Ohio
2021 disestablishments in Ohio